Georgia participated in the Junior Eurovision Song Contest 2016 which took place on 20 November 2016, in Valletta, Malta. Georgian Public Broadcaster (GPB) was responsible for organising their entry for the contest. Mariam Mamadashvili was internally selected to represent Georgia with the song "Mzeo". Georgia won the contest with 239 points.

Background

Before Junior Eurovision
The Georgian broadcaster announced on 17 August 2016, that they would be participating at the contest to be held in Valletta, Malta. Their entrant and song had to be chosen in a national selection show. However, the national selection was cancelled and the artist was selected through an internal selection. On 30 September 2016, Mariam Mamadashvili was selected to represent Georgia. Her song for the contest, "Mzeo", was presented on 24 October 2016.

Artist and song information

Mariam Mamadashvili

Mariam Mamadashvili (born 16 November 2005) is a Georgian child singer who represented Georgia in the Junior Eurovision Song Contest 2016 with her song "Mzeo", which won the contest with a total of 239 points, thus setting a new record for highest winning score at the contest after the 2015 winner Destiny Chukunyere with "Not My Soul".

Mzeo

At Junior Eurovision

During the opening ceremony and the running order draw which took place on 14 November 2016, Georgia was drawn to perform last on 20 November 2016, following Cyprus.

Final
Mariam Mamadashvili performed in a white dress with the microphone in her right hand against a backdrop of a yellow flower which morphs into the sun.

Voting
During the press conference for the Junior Eurovision Song Contest 2016, held in Stockholm, the Reference Group announced several changes to the voting format for the 2016 contest. Previously, points had been awarded based on a combination of 50% National juries and 50% televoting, with one more set of points also given out by a 'Kids' Jury'. For the first time since the inauguration of the contest the voting procedure will not include a public televote. Following these results, three expert jurors will also announce their points from 1-8, 10, and 12. These professional jurors are: Christer Björkman, Mads Grimstad, and Jedward.

References

Junior Eurovision Song Contest
Georgia (country)
2016